Chester John Culver (born January 25, 1966) is an American politician who served one term as the 41st governor of Iowa, from 2007 to 2011. A member of the Democratic Party, he had previously served as the 29th secretary of state of Iowa from 1999 to 2007. He was elected governor in the 2006 Iowa gubernatorial election and ran unsuccessfully for reelection in 2010, losing to former Governor Terry Branstad.

He was also elected as the federal Liaison for the Democratic Governors Association, serving from 2008 to 2009. He founded the Chet Culver Group, an energy sector consulting firm, in 2011 after he left public office. He was appointed to be a member of the Federal Agricultural Mortgage Corporation's board of directors in 2012 by President Barack Obama, serving until 2019, and was re-appointed by President Joe Biden on May 23, 2022.

Early life and education
Culver was born in Washington, D.C. He is the son of Ann (née Cooper) and John Culver, a former U.S. senator (D-IA). Culver attended Bethesda-Chevy Chase High School in Bethesda, Maryland. He studied at Virginia Tech on a football scholarship, where he earned a Bachelor of Arts degree in political science in 1988. Later, he received a Master of Arts degree in education from Drake University in 1994.

Career
After college, Culver moved to Iowa and worked as a staff member for the state Democratic Party. He worked with Bonnie Campbell on her 1990 campaign for state attorney general, serving as field director. Culver had previously worked as a lobbyist under the guidance of Campbell's husband.

From 1991 to 1995, Culver worked as a consumer and environmental advocate in the attorney general's office. After completing his master's degree, he took a job as a teacher in Des Moines. Working first at Roosevelt High School and then Hoover High School, he taught government and history. Culver coached sophomore football and eighth-grade boys basketball during his tenure.

Secretary of state of Iowa
In 1998, Culver ran for Secretary of State of Iowa and won. At the age of 32, he was the youngest Secretary of State in the United States at the time. He was reelected to a second term in 2002 by a large margin. While serving at this post, he created the Iowa Student Political Awareness Club, which attempts to get students motivated to participate in politics when they reach voting age.

Governor of Iowa

In 2005, Culver announced his candidacy for Governor of Iowa. He ran and won in 2006 against Jim Nussle. 

Culver ran unsuccessfully for reelection with incumbent Lieutenant Governor Patty Judge. He was challenged by Republican Terry Branstad, a four-term former governor who was running with State Senator Kim Reynolds.

Post-gubernatorial career
He founded the Chet Culver Group, an energy sector consulting firm, in 2011 after he left public office.

In July 2021, President Joe Biden nominated Culver to be a member of the board of directors of the Federal Agricultural Mortgage Corporation, and he was confirmed by the United States Senate on May 18, 2022. He joined the board on May 23, 2022.

Political positions

Stem cell research
Culver signed legislation easing limits on types of stem cell research in Iowa. "The new legislation allows medical researchers to create embryonic stem cells through cloning. While allowing for further research, it prohibits reproductive cloning of humans," according to National Public Radio. Culver said lifting the ban will "give hope to those suffering from diseases such as cancer, diabetes, Parkinson's and Alzheimer's." In addition, Culver proposed spending $12.5 million to establish a stem cell research center at the University of Iowa. NPR called it a "Key Moment in the Stem Cell Debate."

2008 floods
A September 2008 poll of Iowans found 60% supported Culver's handling of the major floods that struck Iowa and much of the Midwest that year. A year later, Culver and other state elected officials expressed "outrage" at the slow pace of disbursement of federal funding to affected areas.

In 2010, Culver proposed a $40 million "disaster relief fund" in the state and declared March 2010 "Flood Awareness Month."

Minimum wage 
Culver signed legislation instituting Iowa's first minimum wage increase in a decade in 2007, raising the hourly wage from $5.15 to $7.25.

Alternative energy
Culver touted Iowa as the leading alternative "energy capital of the world". He started a "power fund" to assist with that effort.

The Associated Press wrote, 
"Gov. Chet Culver has bet much of his political future on alternative energy. The power fund was a centerpiece of his campaign for governor, and he managed to push the program through the Legislature. Lawmakers have allocated $49.6 million for the effort over the last two years."

Electoral history

Personal life

Culver is a Presbyterian and has served as an elder. His wife Mariclare is a Roman Catholic. Mariclare is also a lawyer with the Office of the Attorney General. She left the office in 2023 after Democrat Tom Miller lost his re-election bid and the incoming Republican asked for her resignation and that of 18 other staffers. His wife gave her personal endorsement to John Edwards in the 2008 Iowa Caucus, then a week after Edwards dropped out he endorsed Barack Obama on February 7, 2008 in Omaha, Nebraska, as the Democratic nominee in the 2008 presidential election.

References

External links

Chet Culver and Patty Judge official campaign site

|-

|-

|-

|-

1966 births
American Presbyterians
Democratic Party governors of Iowa
Drake University alumni
Living people
People from Bethesda, Maryland
Politicians from Washington, D.C.
Secretaries of State of Iowa
Virginia Tech Hokies football players
Bethesda-Chevy Chase High School alumni
20th-century American politicians
21st-century American politicians